The cantons of La Rochelle are administrative divisions of the Charente-Maritime department, in western France. Since the French canton reorganisation which came into effect in March 2015, the town of La Rochelle is subdivided into 3 cantons. Their seat is in La Rochelle.

Population

References

Cantons of Charente-Maritime